Sati (Prevention) Act, 1987 is a law enacted by Government of Rajasthan in 1987. It became an Act of the Parliament of India with the enactment of The Commission of Sati (Prevention) Act, 1987 in 1988.  The Act seeks to prevent sati, the voluntary or forced burning or burying alive of a widow, and to prohibit glorification of this action through the observance of any ceremony, participation in any procession, creation of a financial trust, construction of a temple, or any actions to commemorate or honor the memory of a widow who committed sati.

Sati was first banned under Bengal Sati Regulation, 1829.

References

 The Commission of Sati (Prevention) Act, 1987 at Ministry of Women and Child Development

Social law
Government of Rajasthan
Widowhood in India